One to One! is a Russian talent show based on the Spanish series Your Face Sounds Familiar. The show began airing on 3 March 2013 on Channel One Russia and its first season ended on 26 May 2013. The second season had been airing from 2 March 2014 to 15 June 2014 on Rossiya 1 Channel. The third season has aired since 8 February 2015 to 31 May 2015, fourth - since 6 February 2016.

The show involves celebrities (actors, television personalities, comedians) portraying various iconic singers each week.

Manufacturer — company WeiT Media.

Format
The show challenges celebrities to perform as different iconic music artists every week, which are chosen by the show's "Randomiser". They are then judged by a panel of celebrity judges.
 
Each celebrity becomes transformed into a different singer each week, and performs an iconic song and dance routine well known by that particular singer. The 'randomiser' can choose any older or younger artist available in the machine, or even a singer of the opposite sex, or a deceased singer.

Voting
The contestants receive points from the judges based on their singing and dance routines, as well as voted from the other competitors.

Every judge scales the competitors from 2 to 12 (excluding 11, so called Eurovision System), with each competitor in a different position of the scale. The competitor every judge considers as the best of the week will be in the position with 12 points, while the worst will be in the position with 2 points. Then, the contestants count with 5 points to give to their fellow competitor. The total score of each contestant is then counted by summing the points from judges and the others competitors' votes.

Judges

Judges timeline

Presenters

Series overview

Seasons
  Highest scoring performance
  Lowest scoring performance
  Qualified for the final
  Didn't qualify for the final

Season 1 (2013)
The following chart contains the names of the iconic singers that the celebrities imitated every week.

Season 2 (2014)
The following chart contains the names of the iconic singers that the celebrities imitated every week.

Season 3 (2015)
 On 29 April Batyrkhan Shukenov died after having a heart attack. Until his death the season had finished twelve of its fifteen episodes. The recordings of the last episodes continued but without Shukenov. Before he died he was on the third position in the ranking. The broadcast of 17 May, which was recorded before Shukenov's death, was won by Shukenov and he was named finalist there. The episode which was broadcast before that episode, on 10 May, didn't feature Shukenov because the recordings of this episode were planned on the 30th of April, one day after Shukenov's death. In the end of semi-final episode Shukenov was named the one of two winners of the season posthumously. During the final episode all (including former) participants, judges and presenters paid a tribute to him.
 Although the official rules only allow five finalists; Alexander Rybak was named as sixth finalist during the semi-final, after Maxim Galkin stated that the judges wanted him to be in the final. At the end of the show Rybak finished as runner up.

The following chart contains the names of the iconic singers that the celebrities imitated every week.

Season 4. The Best (2016)
In this season participated nine contestants from the past seasons. Moreover, one extra contestant (also from the past seasons) was in each new release.

The following chart contains the names of the iconic singers that the celebrities imitated every week.

 Highest scoring performance
 Lowest scoring performance

Season 5. (2019)
In the fifth season, 8 ordinary people took part. Each participant has his coach, who chooses the image of the shown artist. The winner of the episode was automatically a finalist of the project.

The following chart contains the names of the iconic singers that the celebrities imitated every week.

Comparison of images

The following table contains contestants scores for images shown 4 or more times

 Season 1
 Season 2
 Season 3
 Season 4
 Season 5

 Highest scoring performance
 Lowest scoring performance

Notes

References

 
Russian music television series
Channel One Russia original programming
Russia-1 original programming